In mathematics, a cusp, sometimes called spinode in old texts, is a point on a curve where a moving point must reverse direction. A typical example is given in the figure. A cusp is thus a type of singular point of a curve.

For a plane curve defined by an analytic, parametric equation

Cusps are local singularities in the sense that they involve only one value of the parameter , in contrast to self-intersection points that involve more than one value. In some contexts, the condition on the directional derivative may be omitted, although, in this case, the singularity may look like a regular point.

For a curve defined by an implicit equation 

The theory of Puiseux series implies that, if  is an analytic function (for example a polynomial), a linear change of coordinates allows the curve to be parametrized, in a neighborhood of the cusp, as

In some contexts, the definition of a cusp is restricted to the case of cusps of order two—that is, the case where .

The definitions for plane curves and implicitly-defined curves have been generalized by René Thom and Vladimir Arnold to curves defined by differentiable functions: a curve has a cusp at a point if there is a diffeomorphism of a neighborhood of the point in the ambient space, which maps the curve onto one of the above-defined cusps.

Classification in differential geometry 

So  is a function from the plane to the line. The space of all such smooth functions is acted upon by the group of diffeomorphisms of the plane and the diffeomorphisms of the line, i.e. diffeomorphic changes of coordinate in both the source and the target. This action splits the whole function space up into equivalence classes, i.e. orbits of the group action. 

One such family of equivalence classes is denoted by  where  is a non-negative integer. A function  is said to be of type  if it lies in the orbit of  i.e. there exists a diffeomorphic change of coordinate in source and target which takes  into one of these forms. These simple forms  are said to give normal forms for the type -singularities.

The cusps are then given by the zero-level-sets of the representatives of the  equivalence classes, where  is an integer.

Examples

 An ordinary cusp is given by  i.e. the zero-level-set of a type -singularity.
 A rhamphoid cusp denoted originally a cusp such that both branches are on the same side of the tangent, such as for the curve of equation  As such a singularity is in the same differential class as the cusp of equation  which is a singularity of type , the term has been extended to all such singularities. These cusps are non-generic as caustics and wave fronts. The rhamphoid cusp and the ordinary cusp are non-diffeomorphic. A parametric form is 

For a type -singularity we need  to have a degenerate quadratic part (this gives type ), that  does divide the cubic terms (this gives type ), another divisibility condition (giving type ), and a final non-divisibility condition (giving type exactly ).

To see where these extra divisibility conditions come from, assume that  has a degenerate quadratic part  and that  divides the cubic terms. The divisibility condition for type  is that  divides . If  does not divide  then we have type exactly  (the zero-level-set here is a tacnode). If  does not divide  then we have exactly type , i.e. the zero-level-set will be a rhamphoid cusp.

Applications

Cusps appear naturally when projecting into a plane a smooth curve in three-dimensional Euclidean space. In general, such a projection is a curve whose singularities are self-crossing points and ordinary cusps. Self-crossing points appear when  two different points of the curves have the same projection. Ordinary cusps appear when the tangent to the curve is parallel to the direction of projection (that is when the tangent projects on a single point). More complicated singularities occur when several phenomena occur simultaneously. For example, rhamphoid cusps occur for inflection points (and for undulation points) for which the tangent is parallel to the direction of projection.

In many cases, and typically in computer vision and computer graphics, the curve that is projected is the curve of the critical points of the restriction to a (smooth) spatial object of the projection. A cusp appears thus as a singularity of the contour of the image of the object (vision) or of its shadow (computer graphics).

Caustics and wave fronts are other examples of curves having cusps that are visible in the real world.

See also

Cusp catastrophe
Cardioid

References

External links
Physicists See The Cosmos In A Coffee Cup

Algebraic curves
Singularity theory